Gahnia deusta is a tussock-forming perennial in the family Cyperaceae, that is native to southern parts of Australia.

References

deusta
Plants described in 1878
Flora of Western Australia
Flora of South Australia
Flora of Victoria (Australia)
Taxa named by George Bentham